A BiCon is a bisexual community gathering, it stands for either 'Bisexual Convention' or 'Bisexual Conference' or 'Bisexual Convention/Conference'. 

 BiCon (UK)
 BECAUSE (Conference)
 International Conference on Bisexuality
 BiFest